Syed Muazzem Ali (18 July 1944 – 30 December 2019) was a Bangladeshi foreign service officer and career diplomat. In 2020, he was posthumously conferred the Padma Bhushan award, the third-highest civilian honour of India.

Early life
Ali was born on 18 July 1944 into a Bengali Muslim family from the Sylhet district, Assam Province in British Raj. He traced his paternal descent from Shah Ahmed Mutawakkil, a local holy man and a Syed of Taraf, though apparently unrelated to Taraf's ruling Syed dynasty. Ali's father was Syed Mostafa Ali, a civil servant employed by the British Raj in Assam Province.

He completed his bachelor's and master's in zoology with first class from the University of Dhaka. He joined the Pakistan Civil Service and was trained at the Civil Service Academy in Lahore. From 1973 to 1974 he studied at the School of Advanced International Studies, Johns Hopkins University.

Career
Ali was serving in the Pakistan Embassy in Washington D.C. when Bangladesh Liberation war started, and he defected to the Bangladeshi government in exile. He helped found the Bangladeshi embassy to the United States. He helped funnel resources from the United States and the United Nations to the reconstruction of Bangladesh. From 1975 to 1978, he served in the Bangladeshi embassy in Poland. He worked in the Permanent Mission to the United Nations in New York from 1982 to 1986 and for the Bangladeshi High Commissioner in India from 1986 to 1988.

Ali was the consul in Jeddah, Saudi Arabia during the Gulf War.  He would go on to serve as Bangladesh Ambassador to Bhutan, Iran, Lebanon, Turkmenistan, France, Syria, and Portugal. Ali was Bangladesh's Permanent Representative to the UNESCO, where (in cooperation with Tony Huq, former Permanent Representative to UNESCO and then UNESCO Special Adviser), he helped establish the International Mother Language Day on 21 February through the introduction of the draft resolution, the Language movement day. He then served as the foreign secretary of Bangladesh, where he worked to facilitate duty free for exports of least developed country to Europe. In 2014, he was appointed High Commissioner of Bangladesh to India.

Personal life
Ali's older brother Syed Mohammad Ali was the founding editor of The Daily Star. His youngest uncle Syed Mujtaba Ali was a writer.

Death
Ali died on 30 December 2019 at the age of 75 at Combined Military Hospital, Dhaka.

On 22 January 2022, Ali was awarded the Ekushey Padak, the second most important award for civilians in Bangladesh.

References

1944 births
2019 deaths
People from Sylhet Division
Ambassadors of Bangladesh to Bhutan
Ambassadors of Bangladesh to France
Ambassadors of Bangladesh to Iran
Ambassadors of Bangladesh to Lebanon
Ambassadors of Bangladesh to Portugal
Ambassadors of Bangladesh to Syria
Recipients of the Padma Bhushan in public affairs
20th-century Bengalis
21st-century Bengalis
High Commissioners of Bangladesh to India
Bangladeshi people of Arab descent
Recipients of the Ekushey Padak